The 1971 Miami Hurricanes football team represented the University of Miami as an independent during the 1971 NCAA University Division football season. Led by first-year head coach Fran Curci, the Hurricanes played their home games at the Miami Orange Bowl in Miami, Florida. Miami finished the season with a record of 4–7.

Schedule

Personnel
QB #12 John Hornibrook

References

Miami
Miami Hurricanes football seasons
Miami Hurricanes football